Bongan or Bangan may refer to:
 Bongan, Baft
 Bongan, Rabor